Edward Franklin may refer to:

 Edward C. Franklin (1928–1982), American immunologist and physician
 Edward Curtis Franklin (1862–1937), American chemist